Vincent Paul Gerard Ventresca (born April 29, 1966) is an American actor, perhaps best known for portraying Darien Fawkes on Sci-Fi's The Invisible Man, and Professor Jack Reed on NBC's Boston Common. Ventresca is also known for his guest starring role as Fun Bobby on NBC's Friends.

Early life
Ventresca was born in Indianapolis, Indiana. The youngest of eleven children, Ventresca graduated from Indiana University with a double major in theater and psychology. In 1995, he married Dianne Shiner, his high school sweetheart. They have a son, Benjamin, and a daughter, Renée Marie.

Career
He starred as Darien Fawkes on Sci-Fi's the 2000 TV series The Invisible Man for two seasons and as Professor Jack Reed on NBC's Boston Common, also for two seasons. He also had a recurring role on the Nickelodeon series True Jackson VP and as Monica's boyfriend, Fun Bobby, on Friends.

He has guest starred on Cold Case, CSI: Miami, Las Vegas, Without a Trace, Monk, Criminal Minds, and Maggie Winters.

His film credits include Romy and Michele's High School Reunion, The Thin Pink Line, Can't Stop Dancing, Love & Sex, The Learning Curve, Dead & Breakfast, and Mammoth.

He has appeared in several stage productions, such as Choices.

Filmography

Film

Television

References

External links
 

1965 births
Living people
American people of Italian descent
American male film actors
American male television actors
Indiana University alumni
Male actors from Indianapolis
20th-century American male actors
21st-century American male actors